Ronald Handy (born January 15, 1963) is a Canadian retired professional ice hockey player who played 14 games in the National Hockey League.

Biography
Handy was born in Toronto, Ontario. As a youth, he played in the 1976 Quebec International Pee-Wee Hockey Tournament with the Toronto Shopsy's minor ice hockey team.

Handy played with the New York Islanders and St. Louis Blues. Handy was more known for his lengthy and traveled career through the minor league circuits of hockey. His last stop as a player was as a member of the Arkansas Riverblades, which he became the head coach of after retiring as a player. 

On July 31, 2015, Ron Handy was inducted into The Committee Hall of Fame. He was only one of six members inducted into the 2015 Committee HOF Class.

Career statistics

References

External links

1963 births
Living people
Arkansas RiverBlades players
Canadian ice hockey centres
Chicago Cheetahs players
Denver Grizzlies players
Fort Wayne Komets players
Huntsville Channel Cats (CHL) players
Huntsville Channel Cats (SHL) players
Indianapolis Checkers players
Indianapolis Checkers (CHL) players
Indianapolis Ice players
Kansas City Blades players
Kingston Canadians players
Lake Charles Ice Pirates players
Louisiana IceGators (ECHL) players
New York Islanders draft picks
New York Islanders players
Peoria Rivermen (IHL) players
St. Louis Blues players
Sault Ste. Marie Greyhounds players
Sheffield Steelers players
Springfield Indians players
Ice hockey people from Toronto
Toronto Marlboros players
Utah Rollerbees players
Wichita Thunder players